The Stamp Collector's Record was the first magazine of stamp collecting published on the North American continent. The first edition was issued from Montreal, Canada, by Samuel Allan Taylor, in February 1864. A second edition was said to have been produced but only a few copies distributed. From December 1864 it was published from Albany, New York, until it ceased in October 1876 with volume 4, number 6.

References

Defunct magazines published in Canada
Defunct magazines published in the United States
Magazines established in 1864
Magazines disestablished in 1876
Magazines published in Montreal
Magazines published in New York (state)
Mass media in Albany, New York
Philatelic periodicals